Saint Valerian (377–457) was bishop of Abbenza in North Africa, probably Dioecesis Zabensis.(it) He was martyred in 457 when he refused to surrender the sacred vessels of his church to the Vandals led by Arian king Geiseric, who outlawed him, notwithstanding his great age, eighty years. Valerian was driven out of the city and left to die of exposure. His feast day is celebrated on December 15.

References

Sources

377 births
457 deaths
Saints from the Vandal Kingdom
5th-century bishops in Roman North Africa
5th-century Christian martyrs